Your Kaiser Dealer Presents Kaiser-Frazer "Adventures In Mystery" Starring Betty Furness in "Byline" is a brief series of live mysteries that aired from November 4 through December 9, 1951, on ABC television.

In the 1950s, when companies directly sponsored entire TV programs, it was not unusual for a sponsor to place its name directly on the title of the show (such as The US Steel Hour or The Bell Telephone Hour). The full fourteen-word title by sponsor Kaiser Motors is believed to be the longest for any program in US television history.

The show was usually known simply as Byline during its six-week prime time run, and as News Gal when the series aired Saturdays at noon on the DuMont Television Network for two weeks in October 1951.

Betty Furness portrayed a newswoman who fought espionage. Other actors featured in the program included Don Cherry, Hank Frost, David Ross, and Bill Stern.

References

External links

American Broadcasting Company original programming
1950s American anthology television series
1951 American television series debuts
1951 American television series endings
American live television series
Black-and-white American television shows
Television series about journalism
English-language television shows